Asan in Iran may refer to:
 Asan, East Azerbaijan
 Asan, Razavi Khorasan